James Hand may refer to:

James Hand (footballer) (born 1986), Irish footballer
James Hand (musician) (1952–2020), American country singer and songwriter
James Hand (presenter), British television presenter

See also
Jamie Hand (born 1984),  English footballer and scout
James Hands (born 1978), English cricketer
James Handy, American actor